Robert B. Wray cast a movable type font for printing Bengali script in 1778. It proved revolutionary for the British rule in India. Warren Hastings had taken over as the Governor-General of India. By the Regulating Act of 1773, he had become the Governor-General over the empire that had been established by the British East India Company in India.

The officials of Hastings were motivated by the European Classicism. They were of the firm view that the rule of Britain over India was transitory. Soon, the great Old Indian culture would revive itself and regain its lost glory. They spent their energy to learn the Indian languages, literature, religion and culture. It has been identified with the Orientialist group among the British officials. Soon, they realized that they had to run their rule by adopting the regional languages. There was a dire need of using Bengali as the language of the administration.

It was made possible when Robert B. Wray cast the Bengali type in 1778. It started a new phase of interaction between the British Officials and Indian people. It resulted in creation of Fort William College under the Governor-General Richard Wellesley. It was under the aegis of this college that most of the literary work of Orientalists had taken place. It was then that European books covering European philosophy and science, were translated into Bengali.

References 
 Jones, Kenneth W. Jones, "Socio Religious Reform Movements in British India". The New Cambridge History of India. 1994. India.

English printers
Year of birth missing
Year of death missing